Cristian Fiél (born 12 March 1980) is a German-Spanish football coach who last managed Dynamo Dresden and former football midfielder.

Career
In his youth, Fiél played for various clubs in his native Baden-Württemberg, before joining Stuttgarter Kickers in 1997, and it was here that he made his professional debut, coming on as a substitute for Alexander Blessin in a 2. Bundesliga match against Waldhof Mannheim in April 2000. He made a further three appearances in the 1999–2000 season, and became a first-team regular the following season, where he scored two goals in 23 appearances, but was unable to prevent the club being relegated.

Fiél then signed for 1. FC Union Berlin, newly promoted to the second tier, and made 33 league appearances in his first season, scoring seven goals. He also got his first taste of European football, as Union had qualified for the UEFA Cup as the previous season's DFB-Pokal finalists, and Fiél played in four matches, assisting two goals in a first-round victory over Finnish side FC Haka, before Union were eliminated in the next round by Litex Lovech of Bulgaria. The following season, Union found themselves in financial trouble, and were forced to sell players, so Fiél was sold to VfL Bochum, getting his first chance to play in the Bundesliga. He finished the 2002–03 season by appearing in 16 appearances for Union Berlin and seven appearances for Bochum.

Fiél made his Bundesliga debut in January 2003, replacing Delron Buckley in a 2–1 victory over 1. FC Nürnberg. He made a further five appearances before the end of the season, but was not selected at all the following season, and in January 2004 he returned to the 2. Bundesliga, signing for Alemannia Aachen. Aachen were in the midst of a cup run, and Fiél helped the club to surprise victories over Bayern Munich and Borussia Mönchengladbach on the way 2004 DFB-Pokal final. Fiél was named as a substitute for the final, and came on for Willi Landgraf in the 73rd minute. He set up a last minute goal for Erik Meijer, but this proved to be only a consolation as Aachen lost 3–2 against Werder Bremen.

As Werder were double winners, Aachen entered the 2004–05 UEFA Cup, giving Fiél another opportunity to play in Europe, making four appearances as the club reached the group stage. The following season, Aachen finished in second place, and earned promotion to the Bundesliga. Fiél made 30 appearances at this level in the 2006–07 season, but the club were relegated, finishing 17th.

Fiél spent a further three seasons playing for Aachen in the second division, before leaving the club in 2010, after six and a half years, joining Dynamo Dresden of the 3. Liga. Despite injuries he was a key part of Dynamo's first-team, making 23 appearances in the 2010–11 season as the team won promotion to the 2. Bundesliga. The season almost ended in disaster, though, as Fiél scored an own goal in the last game of the season against Kickers Offenbach, which almost cost Dynamo their place in the promotion playoff. Dani Schahin saved the day, though, with a winner, and Dynamo secured third place. Fiél was able to make up for his earlier mistake in the playoff, scoring the equaliser in the second leg of the playoff against VfL Osnabrück, and setting up Schahin for the winning goal. Fiél was named as Dynamo's captain in summer 2011 after the departure of Thomas Hübener, but was replaced in this role by Robert Koch at the beginning of the 2012–13 season.

Fiél retired in the summer 2015.

Managerial career
After retiring as a player in the summer 2015, Fiél was hired as a youth coach at Dynamo Dresden. He took over as the interim head coach on 23 August 2018 and was the interim head coach until Maik Walpurgis was hired on 11 September 2018. He lost his only match as interim head coach. On 24 February 2019 he was named head coach of Dresden again. On 2 December 2019 he left the club again after it dropped to last place in the 2019–20 2. Bundesliga.

Career statistics

Club

Managerial record

References

External links
Cristian Fiél at Dynamo Dresden 

1980 births
Living people
People from Esslingen am Neckar
Sportspeople from Stuttgart (region)
German people of Spanish descent
1. FC Union Berlin players
Stuttgarter Kickers players
VfL Bochum players
VfL Bochum II players
Alemannia Aachen players
Dynamo Dresden players
Bundesliga players
2. Bundesliga players
3. Liga players
Oberliga (football) players
Spanish footballers
German footballers
Association football midfielders
Footballers from Baden-Württemberg
Dynamo Dresden managers
2. Bundesliga managers
German football managers